Francesco Forgione may refer to:

 Francesco Forgione (Padre Pio, or Saint Pio of Pietrelcina), an Italian priest who was popularly known as "Padre Pio"
 Francesco Forgione (politician), a member of the Italian Chamber of Deputies